Fred's Head (Blaise le blasé, translated Blaise the jaded) is an animated series made by Spectra Animation (now Echo Media) and Galaxy 7, and featuring Fred, a sixteen-year-old and his not-so-normal life. It is co-produced by France at 35% and by Quebec at 65%.

The show premiered on October 29, 2007 and concluded its first season on July 6, 2008 with 26 episodes produced and aired. The French-language DVD collection was released 9 January 2012 in Europe. The show was formerly reran on Teletoon, and then it was moved to the Canadian French-language television channel, Unis, on September 1, 2014.

Plot
The show is a glimpse into the whirlwind life of a teenager with serious reservations about the adult world. In the courses of his adventures, a multitude of eccentric characters pull him in all directions in search of his identity: a psychotic psychologist, an extremely odd best friend, an exotic lady immune to his charms, fashion trends devotees, and a horror film aficionado.

The show is noteworthy because it deals with problems like alcohol and cheating without beating around the bush; it actually talks about them outright.

Characters
note: While the given name of most of the characters doesn't change in the French-English port, their surnames do.

Leblanc family and neighbor
The Leblanc family live in an apartment along with other neighbors.

Blaise Leblanc (renamed Fred Leblanc) (born on June 23rd, 1992) is a 15 year old teen (who turned 16 years old in the last episode) and the main protagonist in the series who lives in an apartment with his family and neighbors. Fred goes to St Judes High School and has many friends. He plays on the St Judes basketball team, with his friends Gregory-Gilbert and Benji. He has a great imagination and always has a sarcastic thought for any situation. He has had some love interests, the main one being Anette Freeze-Dright, however he also has had some real love partners which are Fanny Cotton and Tamara Hartman. Gregory-Gilbert is his best friend. Fred always looks blasé and this causes him to be followed by the psychologist Anemone Worrynaut anywhere he goes at school. He has also shown courage at some moments. He likes to help people and can do anything to help a friend. Like many teens, he is sometimes angry, easily annoyed and frustrated  at his parents who sometimes consider him immature or overprotect him. He has had some jobs, one at the Clown Shop owned by the Pyrowski Family and recently at the Café. He owns a collection of useless items that includes a lime green door, a rock (offered by GG), dwarf ears, and Fred already tried to add a cellphone-radio-razor to this collection. Fred hates parties though he organized two, a pink party and a Halloween party, each went horribly wrong. He disliked Christmas, as proven in A Christmas Carol, but only due to getting tired of celebrating the holiday in that same episode. At the end of each episode, he tells a quote with a link to the synopsis of the episode. Sometimes other characters are part of the quote. His catchphrases are "moldy" and "I think not". At the end of the last episode, he finally succeeds to tell his love for Anette to his not-anymore-secret crush and the two end up together.
Carol Schwartz (renamed Carol Leblanc) is Fred's mother. Of an unknown age, she sometimes overprotects her two sons, Fred and Boon Mee. As a mother, she has the habit of telling Fred all kinds of tips whenever he quits home for an unknown time. She worked a long time for seniors and takes care of Madame Butterfly, the Leblanc's elderly neighbor. She is still a mother before everything, she is considered a second mother by Gregory-Gilbert Pyrowski. She also created lots of traditions for Christmas. These include the yearly turkey, elf ears and hand-made decorations. She has a sister named Monique. A typical mother, she also has a tendency to do too much for her sons, which Paul always reminds her.
Paul Leblanc is Fred's father. Unlike his wife, he is reserved and lets Fred experience things on his own. Carol always says that Paul gave Fred a too solid shell against real problems. He gets easily angered after the Beast. When he catches a cold, he is cured by Carol. He is also very smart, even brilliant, as depicted on the websites. A typical father.
Boon Mee Leblanc is Fred's baby brother, adopted from Thailand. He mainly spends his time in Carol's or Paul's arms. In earlier episodes, he could only cry and giggle. Now he can say many words. He can name Fred (pronounced "Hed") and Madam Butterfly by their names. He also shows some kind of baby smartness.
The Beast is the Leblanc family's Brown Point Oriental Shorthair cat. A defensive, hostile, hot-headed and certainly crazy cat. He is shown to be very aggressive and territorial to people he doesn't live with, which include the homeless man, GG, Penelope and Aunt Monique. He also likes to mark his territory.
Aunt Monique is Carol's sister. Optimistic and highly Feng Shui, it has been hinted that it may be her fault if Fred is blasé. She has appeared so far in three episodes, 1 as a cameo and 2 in a more important role. During the Christmas special, she meets the homeless man Fred brought home for the family party. They seemed to like each other, but it is not known if it went further. Monique likes the empty space, she feels alone with her feelings when she does so. She is also an adept of unbreakable plates and primal screams. Aunt Monique doesn't live with the family but really likes to visit a lot!
Madam Butterfly is the Leblanc family's Japanese neighbor, Madam Butterfly is looks pretty much like Fred's grandmother. Now deceased, her husband was an actor of the Kabuki theater, playing a woman. She is of an advanced age, and certainly suffers from Alzheimer's. She frequently forgets her own apartment and almost lives in the Leblanc family's. She is kind of a part of the family, since the Beast never scratches her dress nor bites. Of a great Japanese sageness, she frequently tells quotations such as "the old foot knows the path, while the young foot gets lost on the way". She also follows many feng shui traditions, one of them being "no shoes on the floor". Carol is taking care of her. She also believes in spiritism and tries to talk to her dead husband. She appears once in Fred's quotes.

Main teen
Aside from Blaise/Fred.

Fabienne Lajoie (renamed Fabienne Ledger) aka Fab is a horror B-movie fan who studies at St Judes High School. She lives with her parents, who are never at home. Sometimes quick-tempered, she dreams of making bloody and gory horror movies. Cynical to death, she is also independent, anarchist, atypical and short fused. She hates the Hart trio (Penelope and Jody) and Soya and constantly makes fun of them. But Fabienne doesn't truly hate Tamara since Tamara isn't annoying and ditzy like Penelope and isn't mean and arrogant like Jody.  Penelope Truehart gets on her nerves frequently. It has been hinted that she has had a relationship with Fred and that they had their first kiss together. It has also been hinted in the same joke that she is lesbian, something that becomes clearer in the following episodes of the season (i.e., in the episode "Fred TV" she freaks out on Fred for being 'intolerant' about homosexuality). She was brown haired before turning her hair color to red, and is always wearing her signature black lipstick. Her parents never take time for her, so she learned to help herself. She hates all holidays because she never spends them with family. She discovers by herself that she is allergic to latex in the episode "So Long Worrynaut". Fabienne has one known cousin called Fatima, who was romantically involved with GG for a short period.
Gean-Gilbert Pirowski (renamed Gregory Gilbert Pyrowski) aka GG, is Fred's official best friend who studies at St Judes High School. His family name implies that his family comes from Poland. GG is the weirdest character of the show with his unique appearance and extensive vocabulary. Round eyes and belly, strange haircut, big teeth, he is easily recognizable. GG has many dreams for his future, which he tells throughout the series: getting married, having 7 kids, breeding labradors, owning a central vacuum system and a powered car for his progeniture (offspring), a cottage, and many other things. His old sky-blue car is so old that it breaks anytime he drives it and by any means, a recurring inside-joke during the series. It has already hit a tree, a phone booth, and a surgery clinic. He works at the clown shop, a place owned by his family. He has a dead uncle named Lazlo whose body is kept under the counter at the shop. When Fred dated Fanny Cotton, he was sure that she could replace Anette. He considers Carol Leblanc like a second mother. He won the President's underwear at the school fair. At Halloween, he disguised himself as Fred and copied his catchphrases (moldy & I think not...). GG fell in love with 4 girls so far in the series: Fatima, Fabienne's cousin, Clementine, a blasé girl, Sophie Goodheart, Jody's sister, and finally Beatrice, whom he met in Episode 5. Since none of these loves worked, he is still alone and desperately seeks the girl of his dreams, the one who will help him getting everything he ever wanted. In the episode "Blow Out Sale", he sings a song about his four loves.
Benji Jean-Francois (renamed Benji John-Hooper) is Fred's childhood friend and studies at St Judes High School. Now a muscular and powerful teen, Fred could beat him when they were younger. He has a girlfriend, Penelope. He loves to show off his big muscles. He is also part of the school's basketball team. He loves Penelope a lot and gives her lots of small nicknames. Also, he will answer all her wishes, might it be a giant gift or a simple snack. Benji likes everything to be "simple" and thinks Fred always makes everything sound so complicated. Benji lives with his mom in the same apartment building as Fred's family.
Anette Frette-seck (renamed Anette Freeze-Dright) is Blaise/Fred's mysterious and enigmatic dream girl and Fabienne's best female friend. She has jet black hair, piercing eyes and a royal demeanor. Her wardrobe has a definite gothic twist. She is passionate about her art, and is often seen painting or exposing her abstract pieces or self-portraits. Since she is a very quiet and un-expressive girl in general, it is hard to know if she notices Fred's attraction for her. They had a couple of interesting encounters that generally turned out to be somewhat catastrophic. Anette's Dad is an ambassador and her mom an ex-Bollywood star. She lives in a mansion in the upper-class part of the city and is sometimes seen going to school in a limo. Every time Fred tries to help her or express his feelings, something goes wrong and Anette leaves, angry. She had one known relationship with "William Intense", a conceptual artist with pink hair. But she broke up with him after he cheated on her with Jody Goodheart. (ep: "Spills of the heart"). In the very last episode, at the end, Fred finally expresses his love for Anette without anything going wrong and it ends the season with a kiss.

The Hart Trio
Penelope Froncoeur (renamed Penelope Truehart) is the leader of the "Hart" Trio, consisting of Penelope, Jody and Tamara, Penelope is also the dumbest and most naïve. A real airhead. She is totally in love with her "Benji-Poo" and always tries to fix Fred up with girls. Even though she always wants to be nice, she often insults people without realizing it. She lives with her mom and her stepdad. Her favorite expressions are "fizz!" and  "shooty!". Penelope is also obsessed with Panouk's sexual identity.
 Tamara Vadeboncœur (renamed Tamara Hartman) may be the nicest girl of the "Hart" trio, Tamara is reserved and shy. She works at the cafe where all the teenagers hang out. Her dad is Doctor Hartman. Throughout the series, it has become clear that Tamara is in love with Fred. Later in the series, Fred works with Tamara at the café where they experience mutual attraction. Their relationship continues during four episodes but soon, Fred has to choose between Tamara and his secret crush Anette. In the episode "The analgesic of apocalypse", a hospital bound Fred writes Tamara a letter telling her about his feelings for Anette. During the following episode while nursing her heartbreak she completely changes her look, however in the most recent episodes we haven't seen this new look.
Josee Jolicoeur (renamed Jody Goodheart) is the nastiest girl in Saint-Judes Highschool, Jody completes the "Hart" trio. This red haired girl is mean whenever she gets the chance, sometimes with her own friends. She is single and jealous of Penelope who goes out with the hottest guy in school. She was also extremely jealous of Tamara who dated Fred during four episodes. Jody lives with her dad and has a sister named Sophie that looks like a rock chick.

Minor characters
The less important classmates, etc.

Soya Green She's the student with the biggest environmental conscience in St Judes. She's always eager to protest, demonstrate, rebuke and lecture each time someone so much as looks at a dandelion funny. That's why she tends to get on the nerves of some students, particularly Fabienne. She once organized a protest against Anemone Worrynaut's reforms for a "happier life" in the school. (ep: "In the Pink"). Using her journalistic experience, Soya also helped Fred trap a greedy health inspector who wanted to close down the Pyrowski's Clown Shop. (ep: "Business is Business). She hasn't appeared since.
Nino O'Neil This kid is trapped in a spacesuit because he's allergic to absolutely everything in the animal and plant kingdoms, including minerals. At St Judes, he is the ultimate reject. He has a little trouble making friends because he quickly becomes very invasive. One of his goals in life is to finally kiss a girl on the lips. He almost never speaks. He once became Fred's friend, though GG was jealous of this.
Panook Titouk The school enigma. Panook is a tall, quiet and polite teen. One of the goals of the students at Saint Judes (especially Penelope) is to find out Panook's gender identity. For most people, with Panook's androgynous appearance, they could be either a boy or a girl, but Penelope is convinced they are a girl. If anyone asks them specific questions that may determine if they are a boy or a girl, they return with a gender-neutral answer. Panook themself assumes that their gender identity is obvious to everyone, so they do not find it necessary to bring it up. During the most recent episode, Margot (Fred's love interest of this episode) begins dating Panook.
Yohan Chabot is not very smart and spends all his time with Manny Escobar. Like his friend, he likes to play pranks, insulting Nino, rolling on his skateboard and making other extreme sports. Along with Manny, he ruins Anette's exhibit (Move on, there's nothing to see), they roll down the school's stairs on skateboard, they arrive at the pink party with masks (Spills of the heart). He actually uses big words to describe Fred in "Fred TV", but he probably didn't know what he said. It is because of them if Fred accepts a bungee jump for the basketball team. They throw Nino in the pool in the episode "The Make-Up Sausage". They also cause a lot of trouble to Fred when he becomes counselor for a skate park (Fred's Roller-Blading Daze).
Manny Escobar is Yohan Chabot's best friend. Just like him, he is not smart, he likes to make trouble around him, and they are always together, just like brothers. Fred even comes to wonder if they don't share the same brain. He participated in every prank described in Yohan Chabot's description.
Rudolph He appears in episode 14 "Fred TV". He is one of the players on the St Judes basketball team who finally gets the nerve to publicly admit that he is gay after Fred Leblanc "comes out of the closet" on TV. He falls for Fred, but is disappointed when he finds out Fred is not actually gay. He is in many episodes, but episode 14 is the only one in which he has a prominent role. His last name is not mentioned.
Troy Philips An annoying teachers pet, who thinks he is better than everyone else. And makes sure they know it.

St-Judes staff
Theo Sturgeon, the principal
Poky, Theo Sturgeon's dog
Anemone Worrynaut, the school psychologist and the main antagonist of the series.
Hopkins, the canary, Anemone Worrynaut's pet bird
Viona Voula, the French teacher
Baltasar Fairchild, the armless science teacher.
Claude, the hairless monkey Baltasar Fairchild's monkey, also his arms and hands.
Raouf Khandoo, the gym teacher.
Paco Barrier
Valfred

Other families
The Pyrowski family
The Ledger family
The Trueheart family
The Hartman family

Recurring characters

Fanny Cotton Although Fred has been in love with Anette for the longest time, Fanny is Fred's first ever girlfriend. She is a beautiful redhead who likes to obsessively brush her hair all the time and leaves piles of them behind wherever she goes. A new student at Saint Judes, Fanny had a crush on Fred as soon as she laid her eyes on him. In their first encounter, Fred saved Fanny from the rampaging Claude, the science teacher's pet monkey. For her, it was love at first sight. For him, it was the start of a dilemma: Continue trying to get closer to Anette, who doesn't even notice his presence, or take a chance with Fanny, who is nice and seems pretty interested. One thing led to another, and the two of them started going out. But Fred has regretted it ever since. They broke up a week after and Fanny became completely crazy. Now, her life obsession is to get Fred back, by whatever means possible. In the episode "Within a Hair's Breath of Happiness", Fanny comes back, passing as a blond nurse, while Fred is stuck in the hospital. She has a new evil plan to get her Freddie-Poo back. In order to make him unattractive to the opposite sex, she plans on giving him the C-Baldy Bacterium that will make him lose every hair on his body. But Fabienne enters Fred's hospital room just in time and a fierce battle ensues between the two girls. Fanny ends up contracting the dreaded bacterium. Now bald and confined to a padded room in a psychiatric hospital, she still believes she can get her Fred back, planning on using a new identity the next time they cross paths.

One-time characters

Sophie Goodheart She appears in episode 17, "Half-Fried Herrings". Jody's older sister who comes to visit for the summer. GG spots her lounging by the pool at the Hart Trio's pool party. He  immediately falls in love with her. Realizing this she uses it to her advantage to get a ride to her friends cabin in Abitibi. This is the first and last episode she appears in.
Fatima Ledger She appears in episode 8, "Spills of the Heart". She is Fabienne's cousin. GG spots her at the party and 'falls in love'. After talking GG and Fatima realize that they are the perfect couple. They each have the same passion for meat, and share the dream of marrying each other. But when she asks him to go upstairs for some pleasure, he immediately breaks up with her because he refuses any sex before marriage. She is briefly mentioned in another episode, but does not appear again.
William Intense A conceptual artist with pink hair. He appears in episode 8, "Spills of the Heart". In which Blaise/Fred throws a party in hopes of getting a chance to hang out with Anette. But William shows up at the party as Anette's date. But Anette broke up with him after he got caught cheating on her with Josee/Jody  at the party.
Kevin He's a 'sexy' white boy Penelope Truehart briefly falls for in episode 6 "Life is a Highway".
George Dugan actor who plays Captain Splendid.
The Campers of "Camp Woodsy kiddy friends"
The Squirrels Psychotic squirrels from episode 7 "Rodent Terrors". After one squirrel eats a peanut, like an epidemic they all go rabid. And they end up attacking St Judes. At the end of the episode they are stopped by being buried alive and are presumed dead. But before the screen went dark one stuck its paw up out of the dirt. So maybe we'll see them again.
The homeless man
Mr. Julian owner of the Coffee Shop.
Zoe Waters
Nicole
Hyacinth Sylvester runs the watermill at the summer camp.
Margot
Beatrice
Clementine

Voice cast

Episodes
The first season consists of 26 22-minute episodes. Each episode begins with a cold opening and ends with Fred's personal thoughts of the day.

Reception

Awards

Actra Montreal Awards 
 (2008): Rick Jones (voice of Gregory-Gilbert Pyrowski) Winner of Outstanding Voice Performance

Gala des prix Gémeaux (Quebec's Geminy/Emmy Awards — Canada) 
 (2008): Winner of "Best animated series".

Nominations

Actra Montreal Awards 
 (2008): Mathew Mackay (voice of Fred Leblanc) nominated for Outstanding Voice Performance
 (2008): Holly Gauthier-Frankel (voice of Penelope Truehart) nominated for Outstanding Voice Performance

Gala des prix Gémeaux (Quebec's Geminy/Emmy Awards — Canada) 
 (2008): Best script for a youth audience (ep: Episode 4: Dear Madam Butterfly. writers: Manon Berthelet and Mughette Berthelet).
 (2008): Best (web site ) for a TV series.

International Animation Festival in Annecy (France) 
 (2008): Official selection — Best TV series

Cartoon on the bay: Pulcinella Awards (Italy) 
 (2008): Official selection - "TV series for all ages"

References

External links 

2000s French animated television series
2008 French television series debuts
2008 French television series endings
2000s Canadian animated television series
2000s Canadian high school television series
2008 Canadian television series debuts
2008 Canadian television series endings
Canadian children's animated comedy television series
Canadian flash animated television series
French children's animated comedy television series
French flash animated television series
English-language television shows
Teletoon original programming
France Télévisions children's television series
France Télévisions television comedy
Teen animated television series
Television shows set in Montreal